Saint Lucian Americans are Americans of full or partial Saint Lucian ancestry.

Notable people
Nicole Fiscella
Hulan Jack
James Spooner
Joey Badass
Monét X Change
Terance Mann
Chirlane McCray

See also
Saint Lucia–United States relations

References 

 
Saint Lucian diaspora
Caribbean American